This is a list of National Historic Sites in Niagara Region, Ontario.  There are 26 National Historic Sites designated in Niagara, of which nine are administered by Parks Canada (identified below by the beaver icon ).

Numerous National Historic Events also occurred in the Niagara Region, and are identified at places associated with them, using the same style of federal plaque which marks National Historic Sites. Several National Historic Persons are commemorated throughout the region in the same way. The markers do not indicate which designation—a Site, Event, or Person—a subject has been given.

National Historic Sites located elsewhere in Ontario are listed at National Historic Sites in Ontario.

This list uses the designation names as recognized by the national Historic Sites and Monuments Board, not necessarily the official or colloquial names of the sites.

National Historic Sites

See also
Niagara Peninsula
Neutral Nation

References

 
Niagara
History of the Regional Municipality of Niagara
Tourist attractions in the Regional Municipality of Niagara